The Asan Institute for Policy Studies (Korean: 아산정책연구원, Hanja: 峨山政策硏究院) is an independent, non-profit think tank based in Seoul, South Korea. The institute was founded by the honorary chairman Chung Mong-joon in 2008. The institute conducts research in national security and foreign policy, area studies, public opinion, domestic politics, social science methodology, and global governance.

In 2015, it was ranked one of the top 100 think tanks in the world by the Chinese Academy of Social Sciences. The Asan Institute was also ranked 5th among foreign policy and security-related research institutions in the Korea Economic Daily's annual survey of "Korea`s Top 100 Think Tanks in 2016.”

Since 2012, the institute has run the Asan Academy, a special fellowship program to train future leaders of Korea with an understanding of humanities and knowledge across various disciplines. The Asan Institute also launched The Asan Forum in 2013, a bimonthly journal for in-depth interpretation of changes across the Asia-Pacific region.

The Asan Report entitled 'In China's Shadow' was published in September 2016 and contributed to the enhancement of US/China cooperation on North Korea. The report garnered worldwide media attention, making headlines in the Wall Street Journal and New York Times, along with more than 200 Korean and international media outlets.

Leadership
Founder & Honorary Chairman: Dr. Chung Mong-joon

Chairman of the Board of Trustees: Dr. Hang Sung-Joo

The Asan Forum
The Asan Forum is a bimonthly journal for in-depth interpretation of rapid changes across the Asia-Pacific region. It aims to capture the  latest trends within Asia on transformative issues expressed through voices from the region and international assessments. While current events and how they are interpreted are at the forefront, insight into the historical and cultural backgrounds relevant to distinct national responses is also stressed. The objective is to stimulate well-informed observations from diverse perspectives that highlight what political elites and the media in Asia are currently discussing.

Asan Academy
The Asan Academy (아산서원, 峨山書院) offers a liberal arts educational program based on a combination of Korea's Confucian system of scholarship (Seowon) and the University of  Oxford's renowned “Philosophy, Politics, and Economics" (PPE) degree. All  selected Asan Young Fellows live and share the same routine activities throughout their studies in Korea and also learn to bond and appreciate the value of community through monthly volunteer work and community outreach activities. The Asan Academy also provides Asan Young Fellows with the opportunity to work as interns at leading think tanks and non-profit organizations (NPOs) in either Washington, D.C. or Beijing, China. Through international experience and philosophical teachings, the Asan Academy seeks to foster Korea's future leaders with global outlooks, profound knowledge of the humanities, and community spirit.

References

External links
 
 The Asan Institute for Policy Studies Facebook 
 The Asan Forum official website 
 The Asan Academy official website

Research institutes in South Korea
2008 establishments in South Korea